Workers' Communist Party (in Spanish: Partido Comunista de los Trabajadores) was a political party in Spain. Formed in 1977 by the Left Opposition of PCE.

PCT had a youth wing called Workers' Communist Youth (Juventudes Comunistas de los Trabajadores). In December 1977 it initiated the publication Manifiesto. Soon Manifiesto was substituted by Bandera Comunista, which was published in 1978.

In 1980 PCT unified with Communist Party of Spain (8th and 9th Congresses) to form the Unified Communist Party of Spain (PCEU).

References

1973 establishments in Spain
1980 disestablishments in Spain
Defunct communist parties in Spain
Political parties disestablished in 1980
Political parties established in 1973